Heringia calcarata, the opaque spikeleg, is an uncommon species of syrphid fly observed in North America Hoverflies can remain nearly motionless in flight. The  adults are also  known as flower flies for they are commonly found on flowers from which they get both energy-giving nectar and protein rich pollen. Larvae are aphid predators.

References

External links
 External images

Diptera of North America
Hoverflies of North America
Pipizinae
Insects described in 1866
Taxa named by Hermann Loew